"Santa Lucia Luntana" is a Neapolitan song written by E. A. Mario in 1919. (There is also a different Neapolitan song transcribed by Cottreau into Italian as "Santa Lucia"; "Santa Lucia Luntana" is sometimes referred to as "Santa Lucia", leading to confusion.) The song is very popular in the repertoire of many singers. Mario Lanza (Mario! Lanza at His Best, 1959); Luciano Pavarotti [The Best (Disc 2), 2005]; and Russell Watson (Reprise, 2003) recorded notable versions. Italian-American tenor Sergio Franchi covered it in 1963 on his RCA Victor Red Seal album, Our Man From Italy. Also recorded by Mario Frangoulis in his CD "Passione - Mario sings Mario", recorded in 2007 with the Ossipov National Orchestra of Russia, with Vladimir Ponkin as the conductor.

This song was on the sound track of the 1926 movie Napoli che canta.

A movie entitled Santa Lucia Luntana was released in 1931.

References

External links
 Brief overview of popular Neapolitan songs
 IMDB's record for the 1926 sound track for the movie, Napoli che canta
 IMDB's record for the 1931 movie, Santa Lucia Luntana

1919 songs
Italian folk songs
Neapolitan songs
Songs about Naples

no:Luciasangen